The Ellis Island Medal of Honor is an American award founded by the Ellis Island Honors Society (EIHS) (formerly known as the National Ethnic Coalition of Organizations (NECO)), which is presented annually to American citizens, both native-born and naturalized. 

The Medal recognizes — in the organization's words — 
individuals who have made it their mission to share with those less fortunate, their wealth of knowledge, indomitable courage, boundless compassion, unique talents and selfless generosity. They do so while acknowledging their debt to their ethnic heritage as they uphold the ideals and spirit of America.

Past medalists include U.S. presidents, world leaders, Nobel Prize winners, and other leaders of industry, education, the arts, sports and government, along with everyday Americans.

Process
EIHS was founded in 1984, and the medals were established in 1986. A ceremony is held each May on Ellis Island. All branches of the United States Armed Forces traditionally participate. Both the United States House of Representatives and United States Senate have officially recognized the Ellis Island Medals of Honor, and each year's recipients are read into the Congressional Record. The Ellis Island's Great Hall where immigrants were once processed hosts the gala dinner and ceremony. Approximately 100 medalists are honored each year.

Notable medalists 
Notable medalists include:

 Spencer Abraham
 Gary Ackerman
 Shohreh Aghdashloo
 Danny Aiello
 Roger Ailes
 Muhammad Ali
 Madeleine Albright
 Shamsi Ali
 Michael W. Allen
 Goli Ameri
 Cyrus Amir-Mokri
 Ernie Anastos
 Abbas Ardehali
 Gjorgjija Atanasoski
 Igor Babailov
 Maria Bartiromo
 Ajaypal Singh Banga
 Yogi Berra
 Nicolas Berggruen
 Joe Biden 
 Brian Boitano
 Michael Bolton
 Matthew Bogdanos
 Ernest Borgnine
 Peter Boyer
 William Bratton
 Ian Bremmer
 Anita Bryant
 Dan Burton
 George H. W. Bush
 John J. Cali
 Keith Carradine
 Jimmy Carter
 Salvatore Cassano
 Bernadette Castro
 Sam Chang
 Elaine Chao
 Dominic Chianese
 Randolph Chitwood
 Sanjiv Chopra
 Mary Higgins Clark
Bill Clinton
Hillary Clinton
 Jerry Colangelo 
 Claudette Colbert
 Natalie Cole
 Séamus Connolly
 Rita Cosby
 Brad Corbett
 Reza Dana
 Bruce DeMars
 Vince DeMentri
 Wendy Diamond
 Joe DiMaggio
 Phil Donahue
 Kirk Douglas
 Michael Douglas
 Tom Dreesen
 Olympia Dukakis
 Tan Dun
 Victor Dzau
 Michael Eisner
 Emilio Estefan, Jr.
 Gloria Estefan
 Omid Cameron Farokhzad
 Jamie Farr
 Mia Farrow
 Michael C. Finnegan
 Siegfried Fischbacher
 Michael Flatley
 Renée Fleming
 Gerald Ford
 Louis Freeh
 Joshua S. Friedman
 Valentín Fuster
 Paul G. Gaffney II
 Bill Gallo
 Henry Louis Gates, Jr.
 Bob Gaudio
 Hossein Gharib
 Kathie Lee Gifford
 Rudy Giuliani
 Salvatore Giunta
 Richard Greco, Jr.
 Vartan Gregorian
 Peter Gruss
 Sudhir K. Gupta
 Alex Haley
 Adil Haider
 George Hamilton
 Helen Hayes
 David A. Hirsch
 Yumi Hogan
 Evander Holyfield
 Bob Hope
 Roy Horn
 Lee Iacocca
 Mike Ilitch
 Roy Innis
 Daniel Inouye
 Rahul M. Jindal
 Quincy Jones
 Yue-Sai Kan
 Casey Kasem
 Declan Kelly
 Olga Kern
 Jeong H. Kim
 Coretta Scott King
 Henry Kissinger
 Gerda Weissmann Klein
 Wilson Ko
 Padma Lakshmi
 Ralph J. Lamberti
 Stewart F. Lane
 Tommy Lasorda
 Denis Leary
 Jerry Lewis
 Kenneth R. Leibler
 Robert Loggia
 Dave Longaberger
 Susan Lucci
 Howard Lutnick
 Oren Lyons
 Nigel Lythgoe
 Steven Mandis
Salvatore R. Martoche
 Jamie Masada
 John McCain
 Linda McCartney
 Douglas Walter McCormick
 Bonnie McElveen-Hunter
 John McEnroe
 Gail J. McGovern
 Jim McGreevey
 John Mica
 Alan B. Miller
 Arturo Di Modica
 Hamid Moghadam
 Rita Moreno
 Angelo Mozilo
 John F. Mulholland, Jr.
 Firouz M. Naderi
 Jacques Nasser
 Robert J. Natter
 Alex Navab
 Younes Nazarian
 Wayne Newton
 Richard Nixon
 Ronald Noble
 Michael Novak
 Denis O'Brien
 Sandra Day O'Connor
 John O'Hurley
 James P. O'Neill
 Raymond T. Odierno
 Edward James Olmos
 Jacqueline Kennedy Onassis
 Tony Orlando
 Mehmet Oz
 Fatih Ozmen
 Arnold Palmer
 Lou Papan
 Rosa Parks
 Gregory Peck
 Carl Peterson
 Vanda Pignato
 James Henry Quello
 Fahim Rahim
 Naeem Rahim
 Charles Rangel
 Sally Jessy Raphael
 Ronald Reagan
 L. Rafael Reif
 Janet Reno
 Mary Lou Retton
 Chita Rivera
 Mariano Rivera
 Doris Roberts
 Ahmadreza Rofougaran 
 Ginni Rometty
 Henry Samueli
 Harut Sassounian
 Telly Savalas
 Diane Sawyer
 Adam Schiff
 Eric Schmidt
 Martin Scorsese
 Rosanna Scotto
 Tamer Seckin
 Jane Seymour
 Brooke Shields
 Don Shula
 William E. Simon
 Paul Simon
 Frank Sinatra
 Fauja Singh
 Gary Sinise
 Paul Sorvino
 Alex Spanos 
 Robert F. Spetzler
 George Steinbrenner
 Jerry Stiller
 Bert Sugar
 Elie Tahari
 Will Tanous
 Marlo Thomas
 Joe Torre
 Arthur Tracy
 Donald J. Trump
 George Uribe
 Dennis Vacco
 Frankie Valli
 Dick Vermeil
 Meredith Vieira
 Bobby Vinton
 Mike Wallace
 Eli Wallach
 Barbara Walters
 Dionne Warwick
 Donald E. Washkewicz
 Ruth Westheimer
 Elie Wiesel
 Andy Williams
 Aldona Wos
 Chien-Shiung Wu
 Malala Yousafzai
 Tim Zagat
 Louis Zamperini
 Philip Zepter
 Souhel Najjar
 Siggi Wilzig

References

External links
Ellis Island Honors Society – The Ellis Island Medals of Honor

American awards
Awards established in 1986
Ellis Island
1986 establishments in the United States